The 1983 Penn Quakers football team represented the University of Pennsylvania in the 1983 NCAA Division I-AA football season. They finished with a 6–3–1 record and were the Ivy League co-champions with Harvard, whom they defeated in the next-to-last week of the season.

Schedule

References

Penn
Penn Quakers football seasons
Ivy League football champion seasons
Penn Quakers football